KWK may refer to:

KWK, former call sign of the radio station KXFN
KWK-FM, former call sign of the radio station WARH
KWK-TV, former call sign of the television station KMOV
KwK, abbreviation of Kampfwagenkanone
KWK, abbreviation of Kode With Klossy
Kwigillingok Airport